The 2016 Richmond Spiders football team represented the University of Richmond in the 2016 NCAA Division I FCS football season. They were led by fifth-year head coach Danny Rocco and played their home games at E. Claiborne Robins Stadium. The Spiders were a member of the Colonial Athletic Association. They finished the season 10–4, 5–3 in CAA play to finish in a tie for fourth place. They received an at-large bid to the FCS Playoffs where they defeated North Carolina A&T and North Dakota in the first and second round before losing in the quarterfinals to Eastern Washington.

Schedule

Source: Schedule

Roster

Game summaries

at Virginia

Norfolk State

at Stony Brook

Colgate

Towson

at Albany

Villanova

at Elon

James Madison

Delaware

at William & Mary

FCS Playoffs

First Round – North Carolina A&T

Second Round – North Dakota

Quarterfinals – Eastern Washington

Ranking movements

References

Richmond
Richmond Spiders football seasons
Richmond
Richmond Spiders football
Spiders football